Clifton Smith may refer to:

Clifton Smith (return specialist) (born 1985), American football running back and return specialist
Clifton Smith (linebacker) (born 1980), American football linebacker for the Washington Redskins, Cleveland Browns and Chicago Rush